103rd Street may refer to:

New York City Subway stations:
103rd Street station (IRT Broadway–Seventh Avenue Line), in Manhattan; serving the  train
103rd Street station (IND Eighth Avenue Line), in Manhattan; serving the  trains
103rd Street station (IRT Lexington Avenue Line), in Manhattan; serving the  trains
103rd Street–Corona Plaza station, on the IRT Flushing Line in Queens; serving the  train

Metro commuter rail stations in Chicago:
103rd Street–Beverly Hills station
103rd Street–Washington Heights station
103rd Street (Rosemoor) station

Elsewhere:
103rd Street/Watts Towers station, in Los Angeles